Drip line may refer to:

 Nuclear drip line, the lines beyond which protons or neutrons leak out of nuclei
 Tree drip line, the area defined by the outermost circumference of a tree canopy where water drips from and onto the ground, useful for tree crown measurement
 Drip irrigation line, where the tubes and hoses are laid

See also
 Drip (disambiguation)
 Line (disambiguation)
 Dropline (disambiguation)